A publishing house based in London, United Kingdom, Azzam Publications has been accused by the authorities of being "part of a conspiracy to provide material support and communications links to people engaged in terrorism" by authorities.

History
After the death of Abdullah Azzam, the publishers formed a group with the intent of publishing and spreading his militant ideology and related paramilitary manuals through print and Internet media.

The publishing house operated from a London post office box (Azzam Publications — BMC UHUD, LONDON, WC1N 3XX) and an Internet site, www.azzam.com, that was shut down shortly after the September 11, 2001 attacks.

Babar Ahmad, the administrator of Azzam Publications, was extradited from the United Kingdom to the United States. In December 2013, he pleaded guilty to "conspiracy and providing material to support to terrorism" in a New Haven, Connecticut court.

References

External links
  

Publishing companies of the United Kingdom